Quartz Mountain is a mountain located in Greer County in southwest Oklahoma.

Quartz Mountain may also refer to:

 Quartz Mountain (Douglas County, Oregon), mountain located 35 miles (56 km) east of Roseburg
 Quartz Mountain, Oregon, unincorporated community in Lake County
 Quartz Mountain mine, located in Northwest Territories, Canada

See also
 Quartz Mountains, in southwest Oklahoma